Alder College, is a college in Kohima, Nagaland, India.
The college was established in 1992. It offers undergraduate courses in Arts and is affiliated to the Nagaland University.

Departments

Arts
English
History
Political Science
Sociology
Economics
Education

Accreditation
The college is recognized by the University Grants Commission (UGC).

References

External links
Alder College Official Website

Education in Kohima
Colleges affiliated to Nagaland University
Universities and colleges in Nagaland
Educational institutions established in 1992
1992 establishments in Nagaland